Moisés Matias de Andrade (January 10, 1948 – August 26, 2008), usually known simply as Moisés, was a professional footballer who played for several Campeonato Brasileiro Série A clubs.

Playing career
Moisés was born in Resende, Rio de Janeiro state, on January 10, 1948, and started his career playing for Bonsucesso, then he moved to Flamengo in 1968, and returned in the same year to Bonsucesso. He played for Botafogo in 1970, and played from 1971 to 1976 for Vasco, where he won the Campeonato Brasileiro Série A in 1974. He then moved to Corinthians, helping the club win the Campeonato Paulista in 1977, bringing to an end the club's 23 years without winning the state championship. He played 122 games for Corinthians. Moisés briefly played for Paris Saint-Germain of France, before returning to Brazil to play again for Flamengo. In 1979, he played for Fluminense, then he moved to Bangu in the following year, retiring in 1983.

International career
Moisés played one game for the Brazilian team, against the Soviet Union, on June 21, 1973, at Luzhniki Stadium, Moscow.

Managerial career
After retiring, Moisés started a managerial career. He was Bangu's head coach when the club finished as the Campeonato Brasileiro Série A runner-up in 1985, as well as that year's Campeonato Carioca runner-up. Besides managing Bangu, he was also manager of several other clubs, such as Santa Cruz, Ceará, Atlético Mineiro, América and Belenenses, of Portugal. In 2008, he worked as Cabofriense's management coordinator.

Death
Moisés died on August 26, 2008, in Rio de Janeiro, of lung cancer. He was buried at Cemitério São João Batista, in Botafogo neighborhood, Rio de Janeiro.

Career honors
Moisés won the following competitions during his playing career:

References

1948 births
2008 deaths
Deaths from lung cancer
Deaths from cancer in Rio de Janeiro (state)
People from Resende
Association football defenders
Brazilian footballers
Brazil international footballers
Brazilian expatriate footballers
Expatriate footballers in France
Brazilian football managers
Bonsucesso Futebol Clube players
CR Flamengo footballers
Botafogo de Futebol e Regatas players
CR Vasco da Gama players
Sport Club Corinthians Paulista players
Paris Saint-Germain F.C. players
Fluminense FC players
Bangu Atlético Clube players
Bangu Atlético Clube managers
Santa Cruz Futebol Clube managers
Ceará Sporting Club managers
Clube Atlético Mineiro managers
America Football Club (RJ) managers
C.F. Os Belenenses managers
Associação Desportiva Cabofriense managers
Campeonato Brasileiro Série A players
Ligue 1 players
Campeonato Brasileiro Série A managers
Sportspeople from Rio de Janeiro (state)